The 1992 United States presidential debates were a series of debates held for the presidential election. 

The Commission on Presidential Debates (CPD), a bipartisan organization formed in 1987, organized four debates among the major presidential candidates, sponsored three presidential debates and one vice-presidential debates. Republican nominee George H. W. Bush, Democratic nominee Bill Clinton, and Independent candidate Ross Perot met the criteria for inclusion in the debates. The CPD-sponsored vice presidential debate took place between Republican nominee Dan Quayle, Democratic nominee Al Gore, and Independent candidate (running-mate of Ross Perot) James Stockdale.

Debate schedule

October 11: First presidential debate (St. Louis, Missouri) 

The first presidential debate was held at Field House, Washington University in St. Louis, Missouri on Sunday, October 11, 1992 between President George H. W. Bush, Governor Bill Clinton and businessman Ross Perot. Jim Lehrer moderated the debate with Sander Vanocur, Ann Compton and John Mashek as panelists. 

Questions were divided between foreign and domestic policy. It was the first time three candidates shared a single stage in a televised debate. A poll conducted by CNN/USA TODAY on Oct. 11 1992 found that of those watching, 47 percent rated Perot the winner, 30 percent voted Clinton and 16 percent voted Bush. The format decided was:

 No opening statements
 each candidate questioned in turn with two minutes to respond
 one minute rebuttal by other candidates
 two minute closing statements.

Transcript 

Viewership 
An estimated 62.4 million viewers tuned into the debate.

October 15: Second presidential debate (Richmond, Virginia) 
The second presidential debate was held at University of Richmond, Richmond, Virginia on Thursday, October 15, 1992 between President George H. W. Bush, Governor Bill Clinton and businessman Ross Perot. Carole Simpson moderated the debate with 109 uncommitted voters as questioners. Questions were focused primarily on domestic issues and the economy, although no subject was restricted.

Clinton emerged out as the winner of the second debate leading over both Bush and Perot. Poll conducted by CNN/USA TODAY from Oct. 16-18, showed 58 percent calling Clinton the winner, 16 percent said Bush won and 15 percent said Perot. The format decided was:

 Town hall meeting
 two minute closing statements.
Bush was seen on national camera checking his watch while being asked about the effect of the national debt on him personally. In a 1999 Interview by Jim Lehrer, on being asked what he was thinking as he checked his wristwatch, he replied:

Transcript 

Viewership 
An estimated 69.9 million viewers tuned into the debate.

October 19: Third presidential debate (East Lansing, Michigan) 
The third presidential debate was held at Michigan State University, East Lansing, Michigan on Monday, October 19, 1992 between President George H. W. Bush, Governor Bill Clinton and businessman Ross Perot. Jim Lehrer moderated the debate with Gene Gibbons, Helen Thomas and Susan Rook as panelists. The format decided was:

First half: 

 single moderator with option of follow-ups

 roughly two minutes to answer
 one minute rebuttal. 

Second half: 

 panelists posed questions in turn with no follow-ups
 Two minute closing statements.

Poll conducted by CNN/USA TODAY after the third debate found that viewers thought Perot had won. Opinions, however, were tied between Clinton's and Bush's performances; 28 percent thought Clinton had done the best job, 28 percent Bush, and 37 percent said Perot.

Transcript 

  from the Commission on Presidential Debates website.

Viewership 
An estimated 66.9 million viewers tuned into the debate.

October 13: Vice presidential debate (Atlanta, Georgia) 
The vice presidential debate was held at Georgia Tech, Atlanta, Georgia on Thursday, October 13, 1992 between Vice president Dan Quayle, Senator Al Gore and Ret. Vice Admiral James Stockdale. Jim Lehrer moderated the debate with Gene Gibbons, Helen Thomas and Susan Rook as panelists. The format decided was:

 two minute opening statements
 issue presented to candidates with one minute
 15 seconds to respond
 five minute discussion period about same topic followed
 two minute closing statements.

Transcript 
 from the Commission on Presidential Debates website.

Viewership 
An estimated 51.2 million viewers tuned into the debate.

See also 

 Bill Clinton 1992 presidential campaign
 George H. W. Bush 1992 presidential campaign
 Ross Perot 1992 presidential campaign
 1992 United States presidential election

References

External links
 Video at C-SPAN
 Transcript at the Presidency Project

1992
1992 United States presidential election
October 1992 events in the United States
1992 in Georgia (U.S. state)
Georgia Tech